Lower Wardha Dam is an earthfill and gravity dam on Wardha river at Varud (Baggaji) Dhanodi near Arvi in Wardha district but falls under Amravati district in the state of Maharashtra in India.

Specifications

This project's initial contract value is INR 417.30 Millions.

Location
This dam is located at  20.877819, 78.259821 close to a village named Dhanodi near Arvi, in Wardha District of the state of Maharashtra.

Purpose
 Irrigation and water supply

See also
 Dams in Maharashtra
 List of reservoirs and dams in India

References

Dams in Amravati district
Year of establishment missing